Jacob Smith (born June 2, 1990) is an American former professional baseball pitcher. He played in Major League Baseball (MLB) for the San Diego Padres in 2016.

Early life and education
Smith, from North Augusta, South Carolina, was homeschooled through high school and played high school baseball for a team of home schooled students from the Central Savannah River Area. He then enrolled at Darton State College, where he played college baseball. While in college, Smith volunteered as a groundskeeper for the Augusta GreenJackets, the Class A affiliate of the San Francisco Giants, from 2009 through 2011. Eventually he got set up with a bullpen session with Steve Kline, Augusta's pitching coach at the time, who thought Smith had a projectable frame. He threw for Felipe Alou, a special assistant for the Giants, who attempted to sign Smith. Smith instead opted to transfer to Campbell University to continue his college baseball career.

Career

San Francisco Giants
The Giants selected Smith in the 48th round of the 2011 MLB draft.

In 2015, while pitching for the San Jose Giants of the Class A-Advanced California League, Smith pitched to a 4–4 win-loss record, 16 saves, a 2.35 earned run average, and 118 strikeouts in 84 innings pitched. Smith was named the Minor League Baseball Relief Pitcher of the Year. The Giants added him to their 40-man roster after the 2015 season. The Giants designated Smith for assignment on June 30, 2016, to make way for the promoted Grant Green. Smith had pitched to a 2–1 win-loss record and a 7.08 ERA in  innings for the Richmond Flying Squirrels of the Class AA Eastern League.

San Diego Padres
The San Diego Padres claimed Smith off of waivers on July 6, and assigned him to the San Antonio Missions of the Class AA Texas League. The Padres promoted Smith to the major leagues on September 7, 2016. He made his major league appearance in the 8th inning of a September 7 home game against the Boston Red Sox, and on his first pitch, Hanley Ramírez hit a home run. He was released on December 13, 2017.

References

External links

1990 births
Living people
Baseball players from South Carolina
Major League Baseball pitchers
San Diego Padres players
Campbell Fighting Camels baseball players
Arizona League Giants players
Salem-Keizer Volcanoes players
Augusta GreenJackets players
San Jose Giants players
Richmond Flying Squirrels players
Arizona League Padres players
San Antonio Missions players
People from North Augusta, South Carolina
St. Cloud River Bats players